Katherine Laich (January 24, 1910 – November 16, 1992) was a prominent librarian and leader in the profession. She served as president of the American Library Association from 1972 to 1973.

Education 
Laich earned her undergraduate degree from Wilson College in 1930 and her Library Science degree from the University of Southern California in 1942.

Career 
She spent much of her career as a librarian at the University of Southern California.

References

 

1910 births
1992 deaths
Presidents of the American Library Association
University of Southern California alumni
American librarians
American women librarians
20th-century American women
20th-century American people